The Sioux are a large group of Native Americans generally divided into three subgroups: Lakota, Dakota and Nakota.  

Among the Dakota, traditional dance songs generally begin in a high pitch, led by a single vocalist (solo) who sings a phrase that is then repeated by a group.  This phrase then cascades to a lower pitch until there is a brief pause.  Then, the song's second half, which echoes the first, is sung (incomplete repetition).  The second part of the song often includes "honor beats," usually in the form of four beats representing cannon fire in battle.  The entire song may be repeated several times, at the discretion of the lead singer.

Many songs use only vocables, syllabic utterances with no lexical meaning.  Sometimes, only the second half of the song has any lyrics.

In some traditional songs, women sing one octave above the men, though they do not sing the first time the song is sung or the lead line at any time.

Percussion among the Dakota use drums, sometimes with syncopation.  In competition songs, beats start off as an irregular ruffle and are then followed by a swift regular beat.

The Dakota Flag Song begins special events, such as powwows, and is not accompanied by a dance.  Other kinds of songs honor veterans, warriors or others. 

Non-Powwow types of Dakota songs include Sun dance, Yuwipi, Inipi, courtship, flute, lullaby, peyote, and Christian hymns.

Plains Indian music
Sioux culture